The 5P-27 "Furke" is a ship-based 3D air and surface search radar system designed and produced by the VNIIRT (as a part of Almaz-Antey) for the Russian Navy. It is designed for detection, tracking, identification and targeting of air and sea vehicles, including low-flying aircraft and sea-skimming cruise missiles. The radar incorporates a semi-active phased array, digital signal processing, mechanical azimuth scanning (30 rpm), electronic elevation scanning and is able to operate in any weather conditions.

The "Furke" is used on Steregushchiy-class corvettes, and is a ship-based variant of the 1РС1-1Е radar of Pantsir-S1 air defense complexes.

Variants

References 

Naval radars
Military equipment introduced in the 2000s